Psammophiidae is a family of elapoid snakes. They were formerly placed as a subfamily of the Lamprophiidae, but have been more recently identified as a distinct family.

Genera
It contains 8 genera:
 Dipsina Jan, 1862
 Hemirhagerrhis Boettger, 1893
 Kladirostratus Conradie, Keates & Edwards, 2019 
 Malpolon Fitzinger, 1826
 Mimophis Günther, 1868
 Psammophis Fitzinger, 1826
 Psammophylax Fitzinger, 1843
 Rhamphiophis Peters, 1854

References 

Psammophiidae